Oliger Jacobaeus (1650-1701), also known as Holger Jacobi, was a Danish physician and naturalist. He was  professor of medicine, philosophy, history, and geography at University of Copenhagen.

He authored several treatises, notably, Compendium Institutionum Medicarum, De Ranis dissertatio, Romae, Bartholomei Scalae equitis Florentini historia Florentinorum and others. He was appointed by Frederick IV of Denmark as counsellor in his court of justice in 1698 as a token of appreciation.

Early life

He was born at Aarhus in 1650. He studied anatomy at University of Copenhagen  and University of Florence and traveled across France, Germany, Italy, Hungary, England, and Netherlands to improvise his profession. He received his title of doctor in medicine from Leiden University.

He married twice and had six sons from his first marriage with Anne Marguerete Bartholin for seventeen years. After the death of his first wife, he married Anne Tistorph.

He was the son-in-law of Thomas Bartholin and a leading member of Bartholin's organization of comparative anatomists. He died in 1701.

His works
 De Ranis dissertatio, Romae in 1676.
 Bartholomei Scalae equitis Florentini historia Florentinorum in 1677.
 Oratio in obitum Tho, Bartholini in 1681.
 Compendium institutionum medicarum in 1684.
 De Ranis & Lacertis dissertatio in 1686.
 Francisci Ariosti de oleo mentis Zibinii, seu petroleo agri Mutinensis in 1690.
 Panegyricus Christiano Vto dictus in 1691.	
 Gaudia Arctoi orbis ob thalamos augustos Frederici & Ludovicae in 1691.
 Museum regium, sive catalogus rerum, &c. quee in basilica bibliotheca Christiani V. Hafnise asservantur in 1696.

References

External links
 Oliger Jacobaeus
 Jacobaeus, Oliger 1650-1701
 Jacobaeus, Holger (1650-1701)

1650 births
1701 deaths
17th-century Danish people
Danish male writers
Danish anatomists
Danish medical writers
History of anatomy
Philosophy academics